Loco de Amor (masculine), or Loca de Amor (feminine) may refer to:

Television
Locas de amor, an Argentine television series

Music

Albums
Loco de Amor (album), 2014, by Juanes
Loco de Amor, 1992, by Nino Segarra

Songs
"Loca de Amor", 2004, by Belle Perez from The Best of Belle Perez 
"Loco de Amor", 1998, by Café Quijano from Café Quijano
"Loco de Amor", 1989, by David Byrne from Rei Momo
"Loco de Amor", 1996, by Jerry Rivera from Fresco (Jerry Rivera album)
"Loco de Amor", 2014, by Juanes from Loco de Amor (album)
"Loca de Amor", 1998, by Marta Sánchez from Desconocida